Unwinding may refer to:

 Removing frames from a call stack
 Loop unwinding, a software optimization technique